São Mamede (English: Saint Mammes) is a former civil parish (freguesia) in the municipality of Lisbon, Portugal. At the administrative reorganization of Lisbon on 8 December 2012 it became part of the parish Santo António.

Main sites
Botanic Garden
Real Colégio dos Nobres
Palmela Palace
Daupiás Casa e Jardim
Silk Factory

References 

Former parishes of Lisbon